Heterocrossa sanctimonea is a moth of the Carposinidae family first described by Charles E. Clarke in 1926. It is endemic to New Zealand.

Taxonomy 
This species was first described by Charles Edwin Clarke in 1926 and originally named Carposina sanctimonea. In 1928 George Hudson discussed and illustrated this species under that name in his publication The butterflies and moths of New Zealand. In 1988 John S. Dugdale placed this species within the genus Heterocrossa. This placement was agreed with by Dr Robert J. B. Hoare in the New Zealand Inventory of Biodiversity. The male holotype specimen is held in the Auckland War Memorial Museum.

Description

The head is whitish, the thorax grey-white, the antennae whitish and the abdomen pale grey. The forewings are elongate, posteriorly somewhat dilated, the costa gently arched, the apex bluntly acute and the termen almost straight. They are pale grey-white with cloudy markings of dark fuscous. The hindwings are pale grey-white. This species can be distinguished from other species within its genus by its mostly white colouring and that it is larger in size.

Distribution 
This species is endemic to New Zealand and has been collected at Arthur's Pass.

References

Carposinidae
Moths of New Zealand
Moths described in 1926
Endemic fauna of New Zealand
Taxa named by Charles Edwin Clarke
Endemic moths of New Zealand